Octasphales is a moth genus of the family Depressariidae.

Species
 Octasphales charitopa Meyrick, 1886
 Octasphales chorderes Meyrick, 1902
 Octasphales eubrocha Turner, 1917
 Octasphales niphadosticha Meyrick, 1930
 Octasphales stellifera Meyrick, 1914

References

 
Depressariinae